David Thomas Jones FRSE FRSS CBE (1866-1931) was a British administrator and author associated with the Scottish fishing industry.

Life
He was born in Gilfach Goch in south Wales on 10 June 1866 the son of David Thomas Jones.
He was educated at Long Ashton School. For most of his life he worked for HM Fishery Board for Scotland, and wrote extensively on the fishing industry. He served as Secretary 1909 to 1920 and Chairman 1920 to 1931.

In 1903 he married Alison Macmillan Beattie (d.1925). They lived at 12 Polwarth Grove in the west of Edinburgh.

In the First World War he acted as Paymaster to the Royal Navy Reserve. He was created a Commander of the Order of the British Empire (CBE) for his services in 1919. In 1924 he was elected a Fellow of the Royal Society of Scotland. His proposers were Sir D'Arcy Wentworth Thompson, James Hartley Ashworth, James Ritchie, and William Leadbetter Calderwood.

He died on 4 February 1931.

Publications

Whaling in the Shetlands
Development in the Scottish Mackerel Fishing
Development of Lobster Fishing in Scotland (1920)
Rural Scotland during the War (1926)
Scottish Fisheries during the War

References

1866 births
1931 deaths
Fellows of the Royal Society of Edinburgh
19th-century Welsh writers
20th-century Welsh writers
Royal Navy personnel of World War I
Fishing in Scotland